Preston Matthew Edwards (born 5 September 1989) is an English footballer who plays as a goalkeeper for Cheshunt.

Club career
On 4 September 2007, Edwards made his first professional appearance for Millwall when coming on as a sub against Swansea City in the Football League Trophy first round.

In January 2009, he joined Isthmian League Premier Division club Dover Athletic on loan after an injury to the club's first-choice goalkeeper, John Whitehouse. He made his debut in a 0–0 draw against local rivals Ramsgate. Whilst at Dover Athletic, he helped them secure the title and promotion to the Conference South. On 22 June 2009, he rejected a new one-year deal from Millwall, and was therefore out of contract and released.

At the start of the 2009–10 season, Edwards signed for Grays Athletic along with eight other players. On 24 March 2010, Edwards played in a behind closed doors reserve match for Crystal Palace against Millwall. He was released at the end of the 2009–10 season.

Edwards signed for Ebbsfleet United on 28 July 2010, after a successful trial period.

He became a YouTube sensation in February 2011, racking up over eight million views (as of late June 2014), after being sent off just ten seconds into a 3–0 defeat to Farnborough. This is believed to be a record for a goalkeeper.
Despite this setback, Preston became a fan favourite amongst club fans and a key asset for the club. After promotion, Preston asserted himself as Ebbsfleet number one before an ankle injury cut his season short. Despite the club finishing second bottom of the Conference Premier in the 2012–13 season, Edwards drew praise from many for his performances throughout the season and went on to dominate the club's end of season awards ceremony, winning a large majority of the trophies on offer including the Players player of the year and the Fans player of the year award. Although it was rumoured that his services were wanted by John Still, the recently appointed manager of Luton Town, Edwards signed a new contract with the club, keeping him on for the 2013–14 season.

Edwards continued as the club's first-choice goalkeeper for the 2013–14 season and was kept on for the 2014-15 campaign. During that season, his spot as the club's first choice goalkeeper was challenged by Brandon Hall. Manager Jamie Day brought him back into the team for the FA Trophy clash with Forest Green Rovers on 10 January in which he helped secure a 1–0 win. Edwards made his 200th appearance for the club in the 2–2 draw with Hemel Hempstead Town in late February.

Ahead of the 2015–16 season, Edwards joined newly promoted National League side Boreham Wood on a season-long loan deal. However the deal was cut short with Edwards making only six league appearances, and he went on to join Isthmian League Premier Division side Dulwich Hamlet on loan on the 20 February 2016 for the remainder of the season.

With his contract at Ebbsfleet expiring, Edwards signed for Dulwich Hamlet ahead of the 2016–17 season, going on to make 66 appearances in all competitions in his first full season at the club.

In January 2022, Edwards returned to Cheshunt having spent time with the club on loan in 2020.

International career
In October 2010 Edwards was called up to the England C team for the first time.

Family
His sister Steph reached the final of the 2013 series of Britain's Got Talent as part of the band Luminites.

Career statistics

Honours
Ebbsfleet United
Conference South play-off winners: 2010–2011

References

External links

Preston Edwards at Dulwich Hamlet F.C.

1988 births
Living people
People from Cheshunt
English footballers
England youth international footballers
England semi-pro international footballers
Association football goalkeepers
Millwall F.C. players
Dover Athletic F.C. players
Grays Athletic F.C. players
Ebbsfleet United F.C. players
Boreham Wood F.C. players
Dulwich Hamlet F.C. players
Cheshunt F.C. players
Dartford F.C. players
Brentwood Town F.C. players
Braintree Town F.C. players
English Football League players
National League (English football) players
Isthmian League players